Dhammika Siriwardana (15 September 1954 – 15 December 2015) (also known as Dhammika Siriwardena and K.D.T Siriwardena) was a Sri Lankan Film, teledrama producer and a businessman. Dhammika is the founding Chairman of Alankulama Holdings (Pvt) Ltd.

Early life
Dhammika was educated at Nalanda College, Colombo.

Filmography
Dhammika was the script writer & director of film Suwanda Denuna Jeewithe that featured famous actors Roshan Ranawana and Pooja Umashankar. Asai Man Piyabanna was a film produced by Dhammika Siriwardana. Few of other films produced by Dhammika are Rosa Kele, Paaya Enna Hiru Se and Mahindagamanaya.

References

 Dhammika turns over a new leaf with Suwanda Denuna Jeewithe
 Films - Dhammika Siriwardana
 Asai Man Piyabanna
 Asai Mang Piyambanna: Nothing but a light-hearted romance
 Hirunika severely warned by Courts

1954 births
2015 deaths
Alumni of Nalanda College, Colombo
Sri Lankan music video directors
Sri Lankan film directors
Sri Lankan film producers
Sinhalese businesspeople